In enzymology, a L-ribulose-5-phosphate 3-epimerase is an enzyme that catalyzes the chemical reaction

L-ribulose 5-phosphate  L-xylulose 5-phosphate

Hence, this enzyme has one substrate, L-ribulose 5-phosphate, and one product, L-xylulose 5-phosphate.

This enzyme belongs to the family of isomerases, specifically those racemases and epimerases acting on carbohydrates and derivatives.  The systematic name of this enzyme class is L-ribulose-5-phosphate 3-epimerase. Other names in common use include L-xylulose 5-phosphate 3-epimerase, UlaE, and SgaU.  This enzyme participates in ascorbate and aldarate metabolism.

References

 

EC 5.1.3
Enzymes of unknown structure